A self-coup, also called autocoup (from the ), or coup from the top, is a form of coup d'état in which a nation's head, having come to power through legal means, tries to stay in power through illegal means. The leader may dissolve or render powerless the national legislature and unlawfully assume extraordinary powers not granted under normal circumstances. Other measures may include annulling the nation's constitution, suspending civil courts, and having the head of government assume dictatorial powers.

Between 1946 and 2022, an estimated 148 self-coup attempts took place, 110 in autocracies and 38 in democracies.

Notable events described as self-coups
 : President Louis-Napoléon Bonaparte (December 2, 1851)
 : Prince Alexander of Battenberg (April 27, 1881)
 : President Juan Lindolfo Cuestas (February 10, 1898)
 : President Gabriel Terra (March 31, 1933)
 : Prime Minister in duties of the State Elder Konstantin Päts (March 12, 1934)
 : Chancellor Engelbert Dollfuss (May 1, 1933)
 : Prime Minister Karlis Ulmanis (May 15–16, 1934)
 : Prime Minister Ioannis Metaxas (August 4, 1936)
 : President Getúlio Vargas (November 10, 1937)
 : President Higinio Morínigo (November 30, 1940) 
 : King Michael I of Romania (August 23, 1944)
 : President Mamerto Urriolagoitía (May 16, 1951)
 : President Ferdinand Marcos (September 23, 1972)
 : President Park Chung-hee (October 17, 1972)
 : President Juan María Bordaberry (June 27, 1973)
 : Premier Hua Guofeng (October 6, 1976)
 : President Alberto Fujimori (April 5, 1992) 
 : President Boris Yeltsin (September 21, 1993)
 : President Nicolás Maduro (March 29, 2017)
 : President Vladimir Putin (July 4, 2020)
 : President Nayib Bukele (May 1, 2021)
 : President Kais Saied (July 25, 2021)
 : Chairman of the Sovereignty Council Abdel Fattah al-Burhan (October 25, 2021)

Notable events described as attempted self-coups
: President Jorge Serrano Elías (May 25–June 5, 1993)
: President Abdurrahman Wahid (July 1–25, 2001)
: Prime Minister Mahathir Mohamad (February 23–March 1, 2020)
: President Donald Trump (January 6, 2021)
: President Pedro Castillo (December 7, 2022)

See also

 Constitutional coup
 Democratic backsliding
 Soft coup

References

Constitutional crises
Coups d'état